Hand of Blood is the second EP by Welsh heavy metal band Bullet for My Valentine, released on 22 August 2005 through Trustkill Records. The EP is almost the same as the previous, but with completely different artwork and slightly altered track listing ("4 Words (To Choke Upon)" was track 6 on the Japan version of the self-titled EP). Hand of Blood included the single "4 Words (To Choke Upon)", accompanied by a music video, along with "Hand of Blood". The songs "4 Words (To Choke Upon)" and "Cries in Vain" were later included on the band's full-length debut, The Poison. The title track also appears on the limited edition of the same album.

AllMusic asserted that the EP is "essentially a deluxe version" of the band's self-titled 2004 EP.

Appearances in other media 
The song "Hand of Blood" is featured in the video game Burnout Revenge in the in-game soundtrack, as well as in Need for Speed: Most Wanted. "4 Words (To Choke Upon)" is featured in the soundtrack for NHL 06 and Madden NFL 06.

Critical reception 
Daniel Lukes of Decibel Magazine believed that, although the music itself wasn't bad for what it was, it was, in his opinion, not original enough. He compared the EP to Avenged Sevenfold and Atreyu, stating that he thought they wanted to steal their fanbases. He went on to sum up his entire review by stating, "The worst part is that the music itself isn’t all that bad, for the genre." He went on to comment that the band should be "embarrassed" about the release. Zeromag's Josh Joyce complimented the band on "how technical they can get without confusing the kids".

"Damrod" of Sputnikmusic gave the EP a solid 4/5 stars, stating that "the songs are played well and show a lot of potential for the future". He continues to say that the guitar work shows obvious influences such as Iron Maiden and Metallica, without sounding "like a rip-off of these bands". Damrod wrote that the singing style was a successful blend of screams and clean vocals, citing "Hand of Blood" and the chorus of "Just Another Star" as great examples.

Singles

Track listing

Personnel 
Bullet for My Valentine
Matthew Tuck – lead vocals, rhythm guitar, bass guitar (uncredited), guitar solo on track 1 and 5
Michael "Padge" Paget – lead guitar, backing vocals
Jason "Jay" James – bass guitar (credited but doesn't perform), backing vocals
Michael "Moose" Thomas – drums

Production
Colin Richardson – production
Dan Turner –  engineering

References 

Bullet for My Valentine albums
2005 EPs
Trustkill Records EPs